Rochester railway station is on the Chatham Main Line in England, serving the town of Rochester, Kent.

The station and most trains that call are operated by Southeastern and Thameslink, including a handful of peak services to and from  operated by the latter.

In December 2015 a new station on Corporation Street opened  to the west of the original station which it replaced. It is now closer to the town centre and its historic buildings.

Original station
The first station opened as part of the East Kent Railway in 1892. It was set back some distance from the High Street to the east of the busy junction at Star Hill, and access to the platforms was via tunnels from the ticket office.

New station
On 16 January 2014 Gallagher Ltd cast the reinforced concrete base slab for a new subway for the station. A little over a year later, on 26 January 2015, Transport Secretary Patrick McLoughlin was given a tour of the site, and was quoted as saying,  "Rochester’s new station will be a big improvement for this historic town. It will benefit commuters and visitors thanks to longer trains and more seats for passengers.". According to the billboards adjoining the station site, the  concrete subway was to be the first part of the project to be completed; this took place over Easter 2015. Office of Rail Regulation confirmation of the closure of the old station were exhibited at Charing Cross station and elsewhere in October 2015.

Layout
Platform 1 serves trains towards Strood, Gravesend, Ebbsfleet International, Dartford, Meopham, Bromley South into London.

Platform 2 serves trains towards Gillingham, Faversham, Margate, Ramsgate, Canterbury East, Dover Priory, and Ashford International via Sandwich and Deal.

Platform 3 has now opened up at a through platform, service trains towards Gillingham, Faversham, Ashford International and the Kent Coast. Trains can also terminate here before heading back towards London. As the through line runs all the way through Platform 4 of the old Rochester station, it can be used to hold long freight services to allow passenger services to pass, removing a bottleneck.

Service

The typical off-peak service in trains per hour is:

 1 tph to London St Pancras International
 2 tph to  via  and 
 1 tph to 
 2 tph to 
 1 tph to  via 
 2 tph to 

References

External links

Railway
Railway stations in Medway
DfT Category D stations
Former London, Chatham and Dover Railway stations
Railway stations in Great Britain opened in 1892
Railway stations served by Southeastern
Railway stations served by Govia Thameslink Railway